Persoonia spathulata is a species of flowering plant in the family Proteaceae and is endemic to the south-west of Western Australia.

Description
Flowering occurs from December to January and the fruit is a smooth drupe.

Taxonomy
Persoonia spathulata was first formally described in 1810 by Robert Brown in Transactions of the Linnean Society of London from specimens he collected at Lucky Bay.

Distribution and habitat
This geebung grows in heath in the area between Dingo Rock, Cape Le Grand and Israelite Bay in the south-west of Western Australia.

Conservation status
Persoonia spathulata is classified as "Priority Two" by the Western Australian Government Department of Parks and Wildlife, meaning that it is poorly known and from only one or a few locations.

References

spathulata
Flora of Western Australia
Proteales of Australia
Plants described in 1810
Taxa named by Robert Brown (botanist, born 1773)